DeAtley Island is a large ice-covered island lying  east of Spaatz Island at the south side of Ronne Entrance. The island was sighted and roughly mapped from the air by the Ronne Antarctic Research Expedition (RARE), 1947–48, and was later named by Finn Ronne for Colonel Ellsworth DeAtley, United States Army, and his wife Thelma DeAtley, who contributed clothing and food in support of RARE.

See also 
 List of Antarctic and sub-Antarctic islands

References 

Islands of Palmer Land